Florin Motroc (born 8 August 1967) is a Romanian former footballer and current head coach, who previously coached Bahrain club East Riffa.

He is the son of Ion Motroc, also a former footballer and the father of Vlad Motroc, currently player of Liga II side Daco-Getica București.

Honours

Player
Rapid București
Cupa României runner-up: 1994–95
Sheriff Tiraspol
Moldovan Cup: 1998–99

Manager
Jahra SC (assistant)
Kuwaiti Division One: 2002–03

Baniyas SC (assistant) 
UAE First Division League: 2004–05

Shabab Al-Ordon
Jordanian Pro League: 2012–13
Jordan Super Cup: 2013

Al-Riffa
Bahraini Premier League: 2013–14
Bahraini FA Cup: 2013–14

Kazma
Kuwait Federation Cup: 2015–16
Kuwait Emir Cup runner-up: 2016–17

Dhofar
Oman Super Cup: 2017

East Riffa 
Bahraini Premier League runner-up: 2020–21
Bahraini FA Cup runner-up: 2020–21
Bahraini Super Cup runner-up: 2021
Bahraini King's Cup runner-up: 2021–22

Personal life
Florin is the son of Ion Motroc (former Rapid Bucharest and Romania national team player). He is also the father of Vlad Motroc who plays for SCM Zalău. His father-in-law, Constantin Olteanu was also a footballer.

References

External links
 
 

1967 births
Living people
Footballers from Bucharest
Romanian footballers
Romanian expatriate footballers
Romanian football managers
Romanian expatriate football managers
FC Sportul Studențesc București players
FC Argeș Pitești players
FCM Bacău players
FC Rapid București players
CSM Ceahlăul Piatra Neamț players
FCV Farul Constanța players
FC Sheriff Tiraspol players
Liga I players
Liga II players
AFC Rocar București managers
CS Pandurii Târgu Jiu managers
FC Sportul Studențesc București managers
Al-Taawoun FC managers
Kazma SC managers
Dhofar Club managers
East Riffa Club managers
Association football midfielders
Expatriate football managers in Saudi Arabia
Expatriate football managers in Jordan
Expatriate football managers in Bahrain
Expatriate football managers in Kuwait
Expatriate football managers in Oman
Romania under-21 international footballers
Al Jahra SC managers
Kuwait Premier League managers
Al-Shabab SC (Kuwait) managers
Romanian expatriate sportspeople in Kuwait
Romanian expatriate sportspeople in Saudi Arabia
Romanian expatriate sportspeople in Bahrain
Romanian expatriate sportspeople in Oman
Romanian expatriate sportspeople in Jordan
Romanian expatriate sportspeople in the United Arab Emirates
Al Jahra SC players
Kuwait Premier League players
Expatriate footballers in Kuwait
Expatriate footballers in Moldova
Romanian expatriate sportspeople in Moldova
Moldovan Super Liga players